Tinker Bell and the Legend of the NeverBeast is a 2015 American computer-animated fantasy film directed by Steve Loter. It is the sixth and final installment in the Tinker Bell film series, based on the character Tinker Bell from J. M. Barrie's Peter and Wendy. This was the final feature film to be produced by Disneytoon Studios three years before its closure on June 28, 2018. It is also the last of the Direct to video Disney sequels after a 21-year-long run.

Mae Whitman, Lucy Liu, Raven-Symoné, Megan Hilty, Pamela Adlon, and Anjelica Huston reprise their roles of Tinker Bell, Silvermist, Iridessa, Rosetta, Vidia and Queen Clarion. Ginnifer Goodwin joins the cast, replacing Angela Bartys as the voice of Fawn in this film, Rosario Dawson joins the cast as new character Nyx. Singer Mel B also joins the cast as new character Fury in the British release while Danai Gurira voices her in the American release.

Plot

Fawn is reprimanded by Queen Clarion for an incident involving a baby hawk the former kept from everyone. After helping the baby hawk return to its rightful home, Fawn hears an unfamiliar roar and upon investigation, she finds a massive, unusual creature lying in a cave beneath the earth. Fawn tries to help the beast, during which, she discovers that the beast is not vicious and is moving some rocks for building purposes. Fawn stays to observe the beast, which she names Gruff, and helps it build some structures around Pixie Hollow, but has no idea why it was doing so.

Meanwhile, an ambitious scout fairy named Nyx investigates the situation, researching in the library to find out what she's up against. Using some information gathered from several torn pages of an undisclosed animal book, she discovers that Gruff is a creature that awakens about once every millennium when he will transform into a terrifying beast that could destroy Pixie Hollow with a mysterious series of events that culminate in a deadly storm.

Fawn reveals Gruff to her friends and explains that he is actually friendly. She wants to show him to Queen Clarion and reveal the truth about him, but after Nyx beats her to the Queen, Fawn decides not to tell her about the beast. Queen Clarion urges both Fawn and Nyx to work together and "do the right thing" regarding the protection of Pixie Hollow. As such, Fawn sets out to relocate and keep Gruff from the Scouts, while Nyx is determined to capture him and prevent the impending storm.

The next day, before Fawn could move him, Gruff disappears and indeed transforms into the monster depicted in the fairy lore, growing wings and horns. Fawn and Tinker Bell set out to find him before the Scouts do. Tinker Bell finds him first but he doesn't seem to recognize her. He turns and accidentally knocks Tinker Bell away, knocking her unconscious. Fawn finds Tinker Bell and lures Gruff to be captured by Nyx and the other Scouts, grieved by the fact that Nyx was right. Tinker Bell wakes up and explains that Gruff saved her from getting crushed by a falling tree. Fawn realizes she misunderstood the whole thing and sets off to free Gruff with some of their friends.

Tinker Bell, Fawn and their friends successfully free Gruff, and though he is weak from the ordeal of being captured, he and Fawn start the defensive ritual. Gruff redirects and takes in lightning from the crumbling towers, but Nyx destroys the last one before Gruff can get to it. As the incoming lightning strikes ravage Pixie Hollow, Gruff saves Nyx who finally sees the truth about him.

With no time to rebuild the towers, Fawn leads Gruff into the eye of the storm where he absorbs every single lightning strike, ending the storm. Despite the success of the new plan, Fawn is seemingly killed. As Gruff mourns her, the lightning he absorbed makes a spark which revives the fairy.

For the next few days, Gruff helps rebuild Pixie Hollow until the time when he must hibernate arrives. The fairies sadly guide him to his cave in a sendoff ceremony and try to make his slumber as comfortable as possible, while Fawn passes on his legend to future generations of fairies.

Voice cast

Ginnifer Goodwin as Fawn, an animal fairy and the main protagonist of the film
Mae Whitman as Tinker Bell, a tinker fairy
Rosario Dawson as Nyx, a scout fairy
Lucy Liu as Silvermist, a water fairy 
Raven-Symoné as Iridessa, a light fairy
Megan Hilty as Rosetta, a garden fairy
Pamela Adlon as Vidia, a fast-flying fairy
Danai Gurira (US release) as Fury
Mel B (UK release) as Fury
Chloe Bennet as Chase
Thomas Lennon as Scribble
Jeff Corwin as Buck
Olivia Holt as Morgan
Grey Griffin as the Narrator
Kari Wahlgren as Robin
Anjelica Huston as Queen Clarion

Release
The film was released theatrically in selected markets including the United Kingdom on December 12, 2014. In the United States, it had a limited theatrical release, opening on January 30, 2015, at the El Capitan Theatre for a 13-day engagement, and was released direct-to-video on March 3, 2015.

Box office
Overseas, the film grossed $31,178,525.

Critical reception
On Rotten Tomatoes, the film has a rating of 75%, based on 20 reviews, with an average rating of 5.59/10. Metacritic reports a 52 out of 100 rating, based on 5 critics, indicating "mixed or average reviews".

Cancelled sequels
In addition to Tinker Bell and the Legend of the NeverBeast, Disney also had plans for a seventh and eighth film. In 2014, The Hollywood Reporter stated that the seventh film was cancelled due to story problems. The title of the film and the release date was unknown. In addition, Disneytoon Studios was shut down on June 28, 2018.

References

External links

Legend
2014 films
American animated fantasy films
2010s English-language films
2014 animated films
2014 direct-to-video films
2014 computer-animated films
Films set in England
Films set in Wales
2010s American animated films
2014 fantasy films
Films scored by Joel McNeely
American sequel films
DisneyToon Studios animated films
Disney direct-to-video animated films
Animated films about friendship
Films directed by Steve Loter